Kasharsky District is an administrative and municipal district (raion), one of the forty-three in Rostov Oblast, Russia. It is located in the north of the oblast. Its administrative center is the rural locality (a sloboda) of Kashary. Population: 25,355 (2010 Census);  The population of Kashary accounts for 25.8% of the district's total population.

Notable residents 

Ivan Kapitanets (1928–2018), Fleet Admiral in the Soviet Navy

References

Notes

Sources

Districts of Rostov Oblast